Tottenham/Volk Airport  is located  southeast of Tottenham, Ontario, Canada.

References

Registered aerodromes in Ontario